Yongquan Temple is a Buddhist temple located at the foot of Mount Cuiwei, in Mazhao Town of Zhouzhi County, Shaanxi province, China. It is a Buddhist temple for Bhikkhuni.

Name
The name of the Yongquan Temple derives from a spring named "Yongquan", which flows through the temple.

History
Yongquan Temple was first built in the Tianbao period (742–756) of the Tang dynasty (618–907), and rebuilt in 1343, in the 3rd year of Zhizheng period (1341–1368) of the Yuan dynasty (1271–1368).

Yongquan Temple underwent three renovations in the Ming dynasty (1368–1644), respectively in the ruling of Jingtai Emperor (1450–1456) and in the region of Hongzhi Emperor (1488–1505) and in the Jiajing period (1522–1566).

During the 1930s, the temple was a base of the underground Party of the Chinese Communist Party.

The modern temple was founded in 2005.

References

Buddhist temples in Shaanxi
Buildings and structures in Xi'an
Tourist attractions in Xi'an
2005 establishments in China
21st-century Buddhist temples
Religious buildings and structures completed in 2005